The 1939 Brecon and Radnorshire by-election, was a parliamentary by-election held on 1 August 1939 for the British House of Commons constituency of Brecon and Radnorshire, in South Wales.

Vacancy
The by-election was caused by the sitting member, Ivor Guest, succeeding to a title that gave him a seat in the House of Lords. He had been MP for the constituency since winning the seat in 1935.

Election history
Ivor Guest was elected as a 'National Government' candidate, supported by both local Conservative and Liberal Associations. Guest came from a political family that had in the past had a foot in both party camps, so his selection had been a natural choice. The local Liberal Association had not put forward a candidate for election since the 1929 general election and last won the seat in 1923. The Conservatives had won the seat in 1931, and the Labour party won the seat in 1929. When all three parties had fielded candidates, the election had been a close three-way contest.
The result at the last General election was:

Candidates
The local Conservative and Liberal parties could not agree on a joint candidate to succeed Guest as MP. The Conservatives wanted Hanning Philipps, and put him forward as candidate without consulting the Liberals. As a result, the local Liberal Association, which was affiliated to Sir John Simon's Liberal National organisation, formally decided to take no part in the by-election campaign. Philipps was the 35-year-old second son of Baron Milford, who had been educated at Eton.
The local Labour party needed to find a new candidate, as their last, Leslie Haden Guest, had been elected in a 1937 by-election in the London constituency of Islington North. They chose as their new candidate, William Jackson, who was a farmer from the neighbouring Hereford constituency. Jackson had been a Liberal up until 1931, and was thus a more attractive option to Liberal voters than the Conservative Philipps.

Main Issues and Campaign
The nature of the constituency meant that issues relating to Agriculture would be foremost in the campaign.  This placed the Labour campaign at an advantage as their candidate was a farmer and the Conservative candidate had no understanding of these issues; Hanning Philipps admitted at his adoption meeting that he knew nothing about farming. Jackson concentrated his campaign on the policy of guaranteed prices for farmers. 
The absence of a Liberal candidate also allowed the Jackson campaign to appeal to those who favoured a Popular Front opposition to the Government that had been advocated by the likes of Sir Stafford Cripps.

Result
The Labour party gained the seat from the National Government.

This was the last by-election to take place before the outbreak of war, and the last to take place for nearly two months as Prime Minister Neville Chamberlain toyed with the idea of calling a General Election.

Aftermath
The loss of Brecon and Radnorshire for the National Government would have contributed to Chamberlain's decision not to call a General Election for the Autumn.
William Jackson chose not to defend his seat at the 1945 general election and instead accepted a seat in the House of Lords. The local Conservatives, more mindful of the concerns of the local Liberals, chose as their candidate, another member of the Guest family, who had previously sat in the House of Commons as a Liberal. However, by now, the local Liberal Association had ceased being supporters of the National Government and put up their own candidate.

References
 Who's Who: www.ukwhoswho.com
 By-Elections in British Politics by Cook and Ramsden
 Manchester Guardian, 1 August 1939
 Labour and the Countryside: The Politics of Rural Britain 1918-1939
 British Parliamentary Election Results 1918-1949, compiled and edited by F.W.S. Craig (The Macmillan Press 1979)

See also
 2019 Brecon and Radnorshire by-election
 1985 Brecon and Radnor by-election
 Brecon and Radnorshire constituency
 List of United Kingdom by-elections
 United Kingdom by-election records
 

1939 elections in the United Kingdom
By-elections to the Parliament of the United Kingdom in Welsh constituencies
Brecknockshire
Radnorshire
1939 in Wales
1930s elections in Wales